William Brereton (died 21 October 1822) was a planter in British Guiana in the early 19th-century. He was of Irish descent, the son of William Brereton of Mountrath.

He was the owner of the Peter's Hall and Westside plantations and the joint owner of the Taymouth plantation, all in Essequebo, British Guiana.

References

External links 
https://www.vc.id.au/tb/bgcolonistsB.html
https://www.ucl.ac.uk/lbs/person/view/2146630465

Year of birth missing
1822 deaths
Sugar plantation owners